The following list of Bohemian Club members includes both past and current members of note. Membership in the male-only, private Bohemian Club takes a variety of forms, with membership regularly offered to new university presidents and to military commanders stationed in the San Francisco Bay Area. Regular, full members are usually wealthy and influential men who pay full membership fees and dues, and who must often wait 15 years for an opening, as the club limits itself to about 2700 men. Associate members are graphic and musical artists, and actors, who pay lesser fees because of their usefulness in assisting with club activities in San Francisco and at the Bohemian Grove. Professional members are associate members who have developed the ability to pay full dues, or are skilled professionals selected from the arts community.

Honorary members are elected by club members, and pay no membership fees or annual dues. Four women were made honorary members in the club's first two decades, though they were not given the full privileges of regular club members. Several honorary members never availed themselves of the club's offer—there is no record of Mark Twain visiting the club, and Boston resident Oliver Wendell Holmes never visited but he responded immediately with a poem when notified by telegram of the honor, despite being wakened at midnight.

Each member is associated with a "camp", that is, one of 118 rustic sleeping and leisure quarters scattered throughout the Bohemian Grove, where each member sleeps during the two weeks (three weekends) of annual summer encampment in July. These camps are the principal means through which high-level business and political contacts and friendships are formed.

References
Notes

Bibliography
 Bohemian Club. Constitution and by-laws of the Bohemian Club of San Francisco, 1895
 Bohemian Club. Constitution, By-laws, and Rules, Officers, Committees, and Members, 1904 
 Bohemian Club. Semi-centennial high jinks in the Grove, July 28, 1922. Haig Patigian, Sire.
 Bohemian Club. History, officers and committees, incorporation, constitution, by-laws and rules, former officers, members, in memoriam, 1960
 Bohemian Club. History, officers and committees, incorporation, constitution, by-laws and rules, former officers, members, in memoriam, 1962
 Bohemian Club. History, officers and committees, former officers, in memoriam, house rules, Grove rules, 1973
 Domhoff, G. William. Bohemian Grove and Other Retreats: A Study in Ruling-Class Cohesiveness, Harper & Row, 1975. 
 Dulfer & Hoag. Our Society Blue Book, San Francisco, Dulfer & Hoag, 1925.
 Garnett, Porter, The Bohemian Jinks: A Treatise, 1908
 
 Pinchard, Marguerite M. The New society blue book; San Francisco, Oakland, Piedmont, Alameda, 1922, pp. 222–233.
 Scheffauer, Herman George; Arthur Weiss; Bohemian Club. The Sons of Baldur, Bohemian Club, 1908.
 Social Register. San Francisco Social Register, 1927. B
 Stephens, Henry Morse; Wallace Arthur Sabin, Charles Caldwell Dobie, Bohemian Club. St. Patrick at Tara, 1909 Grove play
 Wilson, Harry Leon; Domenico Brescia; Bohemian Club. Life, Bohemian Club, 1919.

Bohemian Club members